Alfred Rieche  (28 April 1902 – 6 November 2001) was a German chemist.

References

1902 births
2001 deaths
20th-century German chemists
Members of the German Academy of Sciences at Berlin
Scientists from Dortmund